Grâce Mfwamba Balongo (born 17 September 1998), known as Grâce Mfwamba, is a DR Congolese footballer, who plays as a forward for Turkish Women's Football Super League club Trabzonspor and the DR Congo women's national team.

Club career 
Mfwamba has played for DCMP/Bikira and CSF Bikira in the Democratic Republic of the Congo, for Malabo Kings in Equatorial Guinea and for ALG Spor in Turkey. She enjoyed the 2021-22 Turkish Women's Super League champion title of her team. In the |2022–23 Turkish Women's Super League season, she transferred to Trabzonspor.

International career 
Mfwamba capped for the DR Congo at senior level during the 2020 CAF Women's Olympic Qualifying Tournament (first round).  In the |2022–23 Turkish Women's Super League season, she transferred to Trabzonspor.

International goals 
Scores and results list DR Congo's goal tally first

Honours 
 Turkish Women's Super League
 ALG Spor
 Winners (1): 2021-22

See also 
 List of Democratic Republic of the Congo women's international footballers

References

External links

1997 births
Living people
Democratic Republic of the Congo women's footballers
Women's association football forwards
ALG Spor players
Turkish Women's Football Super League players
Democratic Republic of the Congo women's international footballers
Democratic Republic of the Congo expatriate footballers
Democratic Republic of the Congo expatriates in Equatorial Guinea
Expatriate women's footballers in Equatorial Guinea
Democratic Republic of the Congo expatriate sportspeople in Turkey
Expatriate women's footballers in Turkey
21st-century Democratic Republic of the Congo people
Trabzonspor women's players